The Mandaic alphabet is thought to have evolved between the 2nd and 7th century CE from either a cursive form of Aramaic (as did Syriac) or from the Parthian chancery script. The exact roots of the script are difficult to determine.
It was developed by members of the Mandaean faith of southern Mesopotamia to write the Mandaic language for liturgical purposes. Classical Mandaic and its descendant Neo-Mandaic are still in limited use. The script has changed very little over centuries of use.

The Mandaic name for the script is Abagada or Abaga, after the first letters of the alphabet. Rather than the traditional Semitic letter names (aleph, beth, gimel), they are known as a, ba, ga and so on.

It is written from right to left in horizontal lines. It is a cursive script, but not all letters connect within a word. Spaces separate individual words.

During the past few decades, Majid Fandi al-Mubaraki, a Mandaean living in Australia, has digitized many Mandaean texts using typesetted Mandaic script.

Letters

The Mandaic alphabet contains 22 letters (in the same order as the Aramaic alphabet) and the digraph adu. The alphabet is formally closed by repeating the first letter, a, so that it has a symbolic count of 24 letters:

Vowels
Unlike most other Semitic alphabets, vowels are usually written out in full. The first letter, a (corresponding to alaph), is used to represent a range of open vowels. The sixth letter, wa, is used for close back vowels (u and o), and the tenth letter, ya is used for close front vowels (i and e). These last two can also serve as the consonants w/v and y. The eighth letter corresponds to the Semitic heth, and is called eh; it is pronounced as a long i-vowel but is used only as a suffix for the third person singular. The sixteenth letter, e (Aramaic ayn), usually represents e at the beginning of a word or, when followed by wa or ya, represents initial u or i respectively.

A mark similar to an underscore can be used to distinguish vowel quality for three Mandaic vowels. It is used in teaching materials but may be omitted from ordinary text. It is only used with vowels a, wa, and ya. Using the letter ba as an example:

  /bā/ becomes  /ba/
  /bu/ becomes  /bo/
  /bi/ becomes  /be/

Gemination mark
A dot under a consonant can be used to note gemination, indicating what native writers call a "hard" pronunciation.

Ligatures
The 23rd letter of the alphabet is the digraph adu (da + ya), the relative particle (cf. Arabic tāʾ marbūṭah, Coptic letter "ti", and English ampersand).

In addition to normal joining behavior, some Mandaic letters can combine to form various ligatures:
  /kd/,  /kḏ/,  /ki/,  /kl/,  /kr/,  /kt/, and  /ku/
  /nd/,  /ni/,  /nm/,  /nq/,  /nt/, and  /nu/
  /pl/,  /pr/, and  /pu/
  /sˤl/,  /sˤr/, and  /sˤu/
  /ut/

Both adu and the old ligature kḏ are treated as single characters in Unicode.

Extensions

Affrication mark

Postclassical and modern Mandaic use many Persian words. Various Mandaic letters can be re-purposed by placing two horizontally-aligned dots underneath. This idea is comparable to the four novel letters in the Persian alphabet, allowing the alphabet to be used to represent foreign sounds (whether affrication, lenition, or another sound):
  /g/ becomes  /ɣ/
  /d/ becomes  /ð/
  /h/ becomes  /ħ/
  /tˤ/ becomes  /ðˤ/
  /k/ becomes  /x/
  /p/ becomes  /f/
  /ṣ/ becomes  /ʒ/
  /ʃ/ becomes  /tʃ/, /dʒ/
  /t/ becomes  /θ/

Ayin

Mandaic ayin is borrowed from Arabic ayin. Unlike in Arabic, Mandaic ayin does not join with other letters.

Punctuation and other marks

Punctuation is sparsely used in Mandaic text. A break in text can be indicated by two concentric circles.

A horizontal low line can be used to justify text.

Magical and religious use

Each letter of the Mandaic alphabet is said to represent a power of life and light.
Mandaeans view their alphabet as magical and sacred.

The Semitic alphabet contains 22 letters. In order to bring this number to 24, the number of hours in a day, adu was added and a was repeated as the last letter of the Mandaic alphabet. Without this repetition the alphabet would be considered incomplete for magical purposes.

Unicode

The Mandaic alphabet was added to the Unicode Standard in October, 2010 with the release of version 6.0.

The Unicode block for Mandaic is U+0840–U+085F:

Gallery

See also 
 Syriac alphabet

References

External links

Mandaic.org: Mandaic and Neo-Mandaic Texts and Resources
Noto Sans Mandaic from Google Fonts
Mandaic Regular Font from the Mandaean Network
Mandaic phonetic keyboard from SIL Keyman

Aramaic alphabet
Abjad writing systems
Right-to-left writing systems
Mandaic language